Towers Hill is a suburb of Charters Towers in the Charters Towers Region, Queensland, Australia. In the  Towers Hill had a population of 218 people.

Geography 
The suburb is to the immediate south-west of the Charters Towers CBD.

History
The suburb presumably takes its name from the hill.

In the 2011 census, Towers Hill had a population of 224 people.

In the  Towers Hill had a population of 218 people.

Heritage listings 
Towers Hill has a number of heritage-listed sites, including:
 Mining works on Towers Hill
 Charters Towers mine shafts

Education
There are no schools in Towers Hill. The nearest government primary school is Charters Towers Central State School The nearest government secondary school is Charters Towers State High School. Both schools are in neighbouring Charters Towers City to the north-east.

Attractions
Tower Hill Lookout is located at the top of Tower Hill and is accessed off Black Jack Road. It has excellent views of the surrounding areas. There is an amphitheatre at the top of the hill where screenings are held after dark.

References

Suburbs of Charters Towers